Bradyrhizobium ganzhouense is a bacterium from the genus of Bradyrhizobium which was isolated from Acacia melanoxylon.

References

Nitrobacteraceae
Bacteria described in 2014